WQKZ 98.5 FM is a radio station broadcasting a country music format. Licensed to Ferdinand, Indiana, the station serves the areas of Jasper, Indiana and Tell City, Indiana, and is owned by Jasper on the Air, Inc. The station's transmitter is located 2 miles southwest of Ferdinand along Interstate 64.

References

External links
WQKZ's official website

QKZ